The 1904 South Carolina Gamecocks football team represented South Carolina College—now known as the University of South Carolina–as an independent during the 1904 college football season. Led by first-year head coach Christie Benet, South Carolina compiled a record of 4–3–1. Captain Gene Oliver played against Georgia with a broken jaw.

Schedule

References

South Carolina
South Carolina Gamecocks football seasons
South Carolina Gamecocks football